The International exhibition of marine and maritime hygiene was a world's fair held in Genoa in 1914.

Summary

The fair was held between May 23 1914 and 15 December 1914 with the aim of showing life in Italian colonies.

The fair was opened by Vittorio Emanuele III and Queen Elena.

Contents
The overall design of the fair was by Gino Coppedè.
There were 1200 exhibitors from all continents.

There were displays from the colonies of Eritrea, Somalia, Cyrenaica and Tripolitania and one about the economics of the territories in Africa.

In addition to individual colonies there was a stadium, a copy of the Galata Tower (which had been built when Galata was a Republic of Genoa colony) and a mosque.

Transportation

See also
 Italian Empire

References

External links
 Images from the fair including the Galata Tower facsimile and the mosque

1914 establishments in Italy
Culture in Genoa
World's fairs in Italy
1914 disestablishments in Italy
Colonial exhibitions